East Serbia of Eastern Serbia may refer to:

 For the eastern regions of modern Serbia see Regions of Serbia
 Moravian Banovina, former province (1929–1941), encompassing eastern regions of modern Serbia and colloquially known as Eastern Serbia
 Southern and Eastern Serbia, statistical region of modern Serbia

See also 
 Serbia (disambiguation)
 South Serbia (disambiguation)
 West Serbia (disambiguation)
 North Serbia (disambiguation)